Ilpo Nuolikivi (25 April 1942 – 7 July 2006) was a Finnish skier. He competed in the Nordic combined event at the 1968 Winter Olympics.

References

External links
 

1942 births
2006 deaths
Finnish male Nordic combined skiers
Olympic Nordic combined skiers of Finland
Nordic combined skiers at the 1968 Winter Olympics
People from Hämeenlinna
Sportspeople from Kanta-Häme